Syndicat National de l'Édition Phonographique (SNEP) is a French music industry organization.

Snep or SNEP may also refer to:

Simple NDEF Exchange Protocol, see 
Ioan Snep (born 1966), Romanian rower
Doina Șnep-Bălan (born 1963), Romanian rower
A shortening of Snow leopard

See also
 SNePS